Tito Ambrosini (24 June 1903 – 14 April 1965) was an Italian water polo player. He competed in the men's tournament at the 1924 Summer Olympics.

References

External links
 

1903 births
1965 deaths
Italian male water polo players
Olympic water polo players of Italy
Water polo players at the 1924 Summer Olympics
Water polo players from Genoa